Slocomb is a city in Geneva County, Alabama, United States. It is part of the Dothan, Alabama Metropolitan Statistical Area. At the 2020 census, the population was 2,082.  The community is named after postmaster Frank W. Slocomb.

Slocomb incorporated in 1901. Slocomb calls itself the "home of the tomato." Slocomb High School mascot is the "Redtop".

Geography

Demographics

2020 census

As of the 2020 United States census, there were 2,082 people, 844 households, and 525 families residing in the city.

2010 census
As of the census of 2010, there were 1,980 people, 816 households, and 554 families residing in the city. The racial makeup of the city was 72.2% White, 22.6% Black or African American, 0.8% Native American, 0.1% Asian, 2.6% from other races, and 1.7% from two or more races. 4.7% of the population were Hispanic or Latino of any race.

There were 816 households, out of which 25.6% had children under the age of 18 living with them, 45.2% were married couples living together, 19.4% had a female householder with no husband present, and 32.1% were non-families. 28.4% of all households were made up of individuals, and 12.8% had someone living alone who was 65 years of age or older. The average household size was 2.43 and the average family size was 2.94.

The median income for a household in the city was $32,212, and the median income for a family was $39,496. Males had a median income of $25,962 versus $21,250 for females. The per capita income for the city was $12,772. About 20.6% of families and 23.8% of the population were below the poverty line, including 32.1% of those under age 18 and 29.5% of those age 65 or over.

Notable people
 Brad Baxter, former National Football League running back. Graduated from Slocomb High School.
 Tony Bowick, former NFL player for the Atlanta Falcons. Graduated from Slocomb High School.
Clay Holmes, an American professional baseball pitcher for Major League Baseball's New York Yankees graduated from Slocomb High School. He made his MLB debut with the Pirates in 2018.

References

External links
 Slocomb webpage

Cities in Alabama
Cities in Geneva County, Alabama
Dothan metropolitan area, Alabama